Romero Mendonça Sobrinho (born January 14, 1975 in Itaguaru), or simply Romerito, is a Brazilian striker.

Honours
Corinthians
São Paulo State League: 1997

Santo André
Copa do Brasil: 2004

Goiás
Goías State League: 2006

Sport Recife
Pernambuco State League: 2008
Copa do Brasil: 2008

External links

 sambafoot
 CBF
 zerozero.pt
 Romerito bem perto da Ilha
 Guardian Stats Centre

1975 births
Living people
Brazilian footballers
Brazilian football managers
Campeonato Brasileiro Série A players
Campeonato Brasileiro Série B players
Atlético Clube Goianiense players
Sport Club Corinthians Paulista players
Botafogo Futebol Clube (SP) players
Associação Desportiva São Caetano players
Marília Atlético Clube players
Brasiliense Futebol Clube players
Esporte Clube Santo André players
Goiás Esporte Clube players
Sport Club do Recife players
Comercial Futebol Clube (Ribeirão Preto) players
Clube Atlético Juventus players
Goianésia Esporte Clube players
Associação Atlética Anapolina players
Association football forwards
Goianésia Esporte Clube managers